Skimmer are an English pop punk band from Birmingham, who formed in 1993. They were originally signed to the Leeds-based Crackle! Records. Once described as being able to "harmonise like hamsters", they supported have many American pop punk bands in the UK: The Mr. T Experience, NOFX, Bracket, All etc. They were also the last band to record a Peel Session on 21 October 2004, shortly after their first drummer's death.

In late 2005, Warren Beater joined the Skimmer camp to take over the drum sticks. Linking up with Nigel Clark as producer, (front man with Britpop chart-toppers Dodgy), they then released two new albums I'll Tell You What (2007) and Self Harmony (2009). Headline tours of Japan, Ireland and the UK followed, along with various support slots around the UK. In 2008 a retrospective double CD Smitten, was released by Crackle! containing all the songs from their out-of-print first 2 albums plus some extra songs.

Recent activity
Having returned from a tour of Japan to promote Self Harmony, Skimmer released the album in the summer of 2011. They are currently signed to the Waterslide Records label in Japan and Heroic Failure in the UK. A single, "Injury Prone", was released on the Heroic Failure label in May 2011.

In September 2022, the band released the album "All Fired Up".

They continue to record and gig.

External links
 

English pop punk groups
Musical groups from Birmingham, West Midlands